Richard Jordan (1937–1993) was an American actor

Richard Jordan may also refer to:

 Richard Jordan (RAF officer) (1902–1994), English Royal Air Force pilot
 Richard Jordan (American football) (born 1974), American football player
 Richard Gerald Jordan (born 1946), longtime American death row inmate
 Rick J. Jordan (born 1968), German music producer